Misty Lee (born 1976) is an American voice actress, comedian and magician.

Early life
Misty Lee was born in Mount Clemens, Michigan, and spent most of her childhood in Detroit, which she credits as inspiration for her unique sense of humor and interest in magic. Before her calling as a magician, Lee trained in dentistry. At the age of sixteen, she discovered her interest in magic, which quickly took its hold on her.

Career
Her onstage performances blend theatre, song, and sleight of hand. She has appeared (as herself) in several comic books, and is a co-creator (and also the voice) of Dinicartoons character Little Rashy. Lee's first venture into magic came when a former high school friend called her and asked if she would like to earn some money as an assistant in his magic act. She was later mentored by some of the leading names in professional magic, including Detroit-based magician Scorpio and illusionist Jonathan Pendragon.

In addition to magic, Lee is a prolific voice actor, appearing in award-winning video games such as The Last of Us, BioShock Infinite, Grand Theft Auto V, Disney Infinity, the Fire Emblem series and more.

She also provided the voice of Aunt May Parker in Ultimate Spider-Man, which airs on Disney XD. At Comic-Con International, Lee designed and taught custom effects to celebrity host and presenters for the "Magic of Comics" themed awards show.

In July 2017, Lee performed on the show Penn & Teller: Fool Us, but failed to fool the hosts.

Lee studied and performed both sketch and musical improv comedy at The Second City in Los Angeles.

She plays the character Misty Hannah in the backstory to Ingress.

Contributions to magic
In 2010, Lee became a staff Séance Medium at Hollywood's Magic Castle, where she regularly performs Houdini Séances. She is the first female magician in history to hold this position.

Lee is the only magician ever to be admitted into the Institute for Analytic Interviewing. Under the training of "Truth Wizard" J.J. Newberry, and alongside agents from the CIA, ATF, and Scotland Yard, Lee mastered the art of cognitive interview techniques, giving her the nickname of "Human Lie Detector".

Personal life
Lee is married to animation producer and comic book author Paul Dini, with whom she lives in Los Angeles. Their two Boston terriers, Mugsy and Deuce, were featured in "Anger Management", a 2012 episode of The Dog Whisperer, in which they sought Cesar Millan's help with their dogs' behavioral problems.

She is fluent in American Sign Language and has worked as a theatrical sign interpreter for Michigan State University.

Lee is an activist against domestic abuse. In 2013, Lee wrote and starred in a short PSA on behalf of the Domestic Violence Hotline titled Escape. The video is a "love letter to [her] mother", who endured years of verbal abuse.

Filmography

Live-action roles
 Birth of Hollywood – Actress
 The $178.92 Movie: An Instruction Guide to Failure
 The Last of Us – Clickers (voice only)

Animation roles
 
 Cereal Mascots: Trix Rabbit – Dante

Video game roles

 Agents of Mayhem – Daisy
 Batman: Arkham City – Museum Announcer, Dispatch Officer
 BioShock Infinite – various voices
 Call of Duty: Infinite Warfare - Laura Gibson 
 Dead Rising 3 – Darlene Fleischermacher
 Disney Infinity – additional voices
 Fallout 4 – Talia McGovern, Molly, Settlers, additional voices
 Fallout 4: Far Harbor – Harbormen, Synth Refugees
 Fallout 4: Nuka-World – Cora, Kate, N.I.R.A., Tula Spinney, Pack Captives
 God of War – Sigrun, additional voices
 God of War Ragnarök – Sigrun, additional voices
 Grand Theft Auto V – various voices
 Guild Wars 2: Path of Fire – Rox
 Infamous Second Son – Hank's Daughter, additional voices
 League of Legends – Kalista (the Spear of Vengeance)
 Lego DC Super-Villains – Enchantress, Ravager 
 Resident Evil: Revelations 2 – additional voices
 Saints Row IV – Dominatrix
 Skylanders: Swap Force – Star Strike 
 StarCraft II: Legacy of the Void - Liberator
 World of Warcraft: Battle for Azeroth – Lady Liadrin

References

Further reading
 Interview with Misty Lee, Wizard, 1998
 Article on Paul Dini's "Madame Mirage" comic, Wizard, No. 187, April 2007

External links 

 Official Misty Lee website 
 Official Misty Lee voiceover site
 The Radio Rashy podcast, featuring Paul Dini and Misty Lee
 "The Adventures of Little Rashy" by Paul Dini and Misty Lee
 Monkey Talk with Paul Dini and Little Rashy
 

21st-century American actresses
Actresses from Detroit
American magicians
People from Mount Clemens, Michigan
American video game actresses
American voice actresses
Living people
American women comedians
Female magicians
21st-century American comedians
1976 births